Thomas K. Finletter was a judge of the Court of the Common Pleas in Pennsylvania. His grandson was Thomas K. Finletter. The Thomas K. Finletter School was named for him.

References 

American judges
Year of birth missing
Year of death missing